TechnoCalyps is a 2006 Belgian transhumanism documentary film written and directed by Frank Theys. It explores the advance of technology.

Documentary precept
Set as a three-part documentary, TechnoCalyps posits that genetics, robotics, artificial intelligence, bionics, and nanotechnology seem to be converging towards a goal of having mankind transcend human limits.  "Director conducts his inquiry into the scientific, ethical and metaphysical dimensions of technological development. The film includes interviews by top experts and thinkers on the subject worldwide".

Cast
Jay McMahon narrated the documentary that has following interviewees: 

 Ian Buruma 
 Jean-Jacques Cassiman
 L. Stephen Coles
 Sadaputa Dasa
 Hugo De Garis
 Aubrey de Grey
 Theodore John Kaczynski
 Raymond Kurzweil
 Jeffrey Lichtman
 Ralph C. Merkle
 Marvin Minsky
 Hans Moravec
 Max More
 David F. Noble
 Mark Pesce
 Joe Rosen
 Kirkpatrick Sale
 Anders Sandberg
 Richard Seed
 Bruce Sterling
 Gregory Stock
 Mark W. Tilden
 Frank Tipler
 Margaret Wertheim
 Robert J. White
 Robert Anton Wilson
 Terence McKenna
 Rael
 Osman Bakar
 Michel Baudry
 Ted Berger
 Yang Dan
 Thomas B. DeMarse
 Anne Foerst
 Erin D. Green
 Mark Humayun
 Hamada Kazuyuki
 Carlo Montemagno
 Natasha Vita-More
 Jim Yount

Reception
H+ Magazine wrote that the film focuses "on the various emerging technologies that Transhumanism has coalesced around and feature illuminating (or potentially terrifying) interviews with scientists working in these fields", and Crónicas de Esperantia wrote that the film was an excellent documentary that shares some future keys.  Christopher Webster of Quiet Earth reviewed the documentary and wrote that it "is a really smart look at humanity's quest for immortality through science" and how with its focus on hard science "gets into how this quest effects art and culture and how the whole mess intersects to form the very fabric of who we are."

See also
 Existential risk from artificial general intelligence
 Ancient astronauts
 Building Gods (documentary)
 Effective altruism
 Global catastrophic risk#Anthropogenic

References

External links
 
 
  TechnoCalyps: Part I. TransHuman
  TechnoCalyps: Part II. Preparing for the Singularity
  TechnoCalyps: Part III. The Digital Messiah

Transhumanism
Futurology documentaries
2000s English-language films